Van de Vijver is a Dutch toponymic surname meaning "from the pond". Notable people with the surname include:
Arthur Van De Vijver (1948–1992), Belgian racing cyclist
Fons van de Vijver (born 1952), Dutch psychologist
Frank Van De Vijver (born 1962), former Belgian racing cyclist
Heidi Van De Vijver (born 1969), former Belgian racing cyclist
Walter van de Vijver (born 1955), Dutch businessman
Van de Vyver
Augustine Van de Vyver (1844–1911), Belgian-American Catholic priest
Ilka Van de Vyver (born 1993), Belgian volleyball player
Van de Weijer
Jeroen van de Weijer (born 1965), Dutch linguist
Vyver
Bertha Vyver (1854–1941), English novelist

See also
Weijers
Van der Vyver

References

Dutch-language surnames
Surnames of Belgian origin